The Cross Keys is a Grade II listed public house at 31 Endell Street, Covent Garden, London W1.

It was built in 1848–49.

References

Grade II listed pubs in London
Endell Street, London
Buildings and structures completed in 1849
19th-century architecture in the United Kingdom
1849 establishments in England
Grade II listed buildings in the London Borough of Camden